Jaxson de Ville is the mascot of the Jacksonville Jaguars, a National Football League football franchise. His name is spelled "Jaxson" because Jacksonville, Florida, is often shortened to "Jax." He is an anthropomorphic jaguar and is yellow with teal patches. He wears sunglasses, a Jaguars jersey, long shorts, and black and teal sneakers. The back of his jersey is typical: it reads "Jaxson" with his number, 00, but the front has a paw print. On certain occasions he wears other outfits, such as a large military field uniform when he was brought onto the field in a military jeep. However, he finds other creative ways to enter the stadium: using a zip wire to bungee jump off the stadium lights or sliding down a rope from the scoreboard. He is rarely seen without his motorized scooter and can sometimes be seen driving a golf cart. After Jaguar wins, he jumps into the pool at TIAA Bank Field.

Controversies
Jaxson is known for his crazy antics. He is very interactive with the crowd and the Jaguars (if they're not too busy), and sometimes interacts with the opposing team's players as well. He often mocks and jokes with the other team's mascot, if they are present. These acts got him into trouble in 1998 and stemmed the changing of the NFL's mascot rules, and also caused him to calm up. However, Jaxson was still seen, by some, as a mascot that gets in the way during the game.  After the October 22, 2007 game against Indianapolis, Colts President Bill Polian complained to the NFL, and Jaxson was reprimanded again. During the November 18, 2007 home game Jaxson spent a good portion of the game in a makeshift "cage", but was released for short periods of time so he could interact with fans and also to give him an opportunity to ride his scooter.

Another controversy arose during an online NFL mascot competition, where Raiders fans and Jaguars fans were to vote for their mascots. During the process, a loophole was found allowing individual users to vote tens of thousands of times, enabling the Jags and Raiders to get well over 1 million votes, disqualifying both mascots from the competition.

Jaxson appears at many events and around the Jacksonville community supporting various causes. He also participates in NFL and other mascot events such as the 2002 mascot convention that was held in New York City. Jaxson also contributes to the Jaguars' journal, provided by First Coast Community, which allows fans to post photos and includes journal entries from the mascot as well as the team members and Jacksonville Roar members (the Jaguars cheerleaders).

In recent years, Jaxson has been taking bigger risks, including making bungee jumping and zipline entrances from the TIAA Bank Field light fixtures. On December 16, 2009, he ended up getting stuck during a zipline stunt and hung above the field by his feet for three minutes while crews tried to free him. His performer was not injured.

Jaxson's first appearance was on August 18, 1996 and had been played by Curtis Dvorak until his retirement in June 2015.

The mascot stirred further controversy, during the 2014 Ebola crisis, when he carried a sign reading "Towels Carry Ebola" along with a Terrible Towel from the Pittsburgh Steelers.

On May 23, 2020, Jaxson made a cameo appearance during the "Stadium Stampede" match of All Elite Wrestling's Double or Nothing pay-per-view (which was set inside TIAA Bank Field, with the rest of the show taking place at the neighboring Daily's Place; team owner Shahid Khan is also one of AEW's lead investors), where Chris Jericho performed a Judas Effect on the mascot.

On November 27, 2022, Jaxson was seen wearing an American flag speedo and dancing provocatively during a game against the Baltimore Ravens.

References

External links
 Jaxon de Ville on Jaguars website
 Interview with Jaxson de Ville

Jacksonville Jaguars
National Football League mascots
Felid mascots
1996 establishments in Florida